Javed Qadeer (born August 25, 1976, Karachi,  Sindh) is a former Pakistani cricketer who played one ODI in 1995 as a wicket-keeper.

According to one incident, quoted by Mirza Iqbal Baig, Wasim Akram asked for a wicket keeper from the selectors hours before a Sharjah Match. Javed Qadeer played and also worked at the National Stadium, Karachi but on the way to Airport someone handled him Coca-Cola and he missed the flight drinking it and delayed his much awaited arrival as PCB had to arrange a passenger seat requesting much higher authorities. He now coaches at the DHA Sports Club, Moin Khan Academy, A.O Cricket Academy.

References 

1976 births
Living people
Pakistan One Day International cricketers
Cricketers at the 1998 Commonwealth Games
Pakistani cricketers
Pakistan International Airlines cricketers
Karachi Blues cricketers
Karachi Whites cricketers
Karachi cricketers
Karachi Port Trust cricketers
National Bank of Pakistan cricketers
Karachi Zebras cricketers
Cricketers from Karachi
Commonwealth Games competitors for Pakistan